Dallas is a borough in Luzerne County, Pennsylvania, United States. The population was 2,692 at the 2020 census. The local government describes the borough as the "Pride" of the Back Mountain (a 118 square mile region in northern Luzerne County). The area includes the townships of Dallas, Franklin, Jackson, Kingston, Lake, and Lehman. The region also includes the boroughs of Dallas and Harveys Lake. Dallas is in the vicinity of Misericordia University and Dallas State Correctional Institution (which holds 2,150 inmates).

History
Dallas was first settled in 1797. It was later incorporated as a borough on April 21, 1879, from land entirely within Dallas Township.  The township had been formed in 1817 and was named for Alexander J. Dallas, who was the 6th United States Secretary of the Treasury and the father of George M. Dallas, the vice president of James Polk.

Geography

Most of Dallas is urbanized; however, there are pockets of forests scattered throughout the borough. PA 309 and PA 415 travel through the northern and eastern sections of Dallas. The Huntsville Reservoir makes up the community’s southwestern border. Dallas Township borders the borough from the north, east, and south. Lehman Township borders the community from the west.

Demographics

At the 2000 census there were 2,557 people, 1,031 households, and 715 families residing in the borough. The population density was 1,116.9 people per square mile (431.1/km2). There were 1,094 housing units at an average density of 477.8 per square mile (184.5/km2).
The racial makeup of the borough was 97.97% White, 0.47% African American, 0.08% Native American, 0.78% Asian, 0.12% from other races, and 0.59% from two or more races. Hispanic or Latino of any race were 0.66% of the population.

There were 1,031 households, 29.4% had children under the age of 18 living with them, 58.5% were married couples living together, 8.5% had a female householder with no husband present, and 30.6% were non-families. 25.4% of households were made up of individuals, and 11.2% were one person aged 65 or older. The average household size was 2.44 and the average family size was 2.96.

In the borough the population was spread out, with 21.8% under the age of 18, 6.5% from 18 to 24, 27.4% from 25 to 44, 26.4% from 45 to 64, and 17.8% 65 or older. The median age was 42 years. For every 100 females there were 90.0 males. For every 100 females age 18 and over, there were 85.0 males.

The median household income was $48,696 and the median family income  was $57,344. Males had a median income of $41,500 versus $25,571 for females. The per capita income for the borough was $24,466. About 3.5% of families and 5.8% of the population were below the poverty line, including 6.0% of those under age 18 and 4.7% of those age 65 or over.

Notable people
Greg Manusky, inside linebacker coach, Minnesota Vikings
Francis T. McAndrew, psychologist, professor, and author
Dan Meuser, U.S. Congressman
Paige Selenski, U.S. Olympic field hockey player, 2012 Summer Olympics
Stacey Williams, fashion model

References

External links

Populated places established in 1797
Boroughs in Luzerne County, Pennsylvania
1879 establishments in Pennsylvania